The Battle of Gujrat was a decisive battle in the Second Anglo-Sikh War, fought on 21 February 1849, between the forces of the East India Company, and a Sikh army in rebellion against the company's control of the Sikh Empire, represented by the child Maharaja Duleep Singh who was in British custody in Lahore. The Sikh army was defeated by the British regular and Bengal Army forces of the British East India Company. After it capitulated a few days later, the Punjab was annexed to the East India Company's territories and Duleep Singh was deposed.

Outbreak and course of the war
After the British victory in the First Anglo-Sikh War, the Punjab was indirectly governed by a British representative at the Durbar (court) in Lahore and Agents in several of the regions. The Sikh Army, the Khalsa, was kept in being and used to keep order in the Punjab and North West Frontier Region. The Khalsa regarded itself as betrayed rather than defeated in the first war, and several of its Sardars (Generals) plotted rebellion.

However, the first outbreak came at Multan on 18 April 1848, where rebellious troops murdered a British agent, Lieutenant Patrick Vans Agnew, and expelled a Sirdar imposed as ruler by the British Resident at Lahore. The former ruler, Dewan Mulraj, resumed his authority and prepared for a siege. Rather than use large forces from the British and Bengal Armies during the hot weather and monsoon seasons, the Governor General of Bengal, Lord Dalhousie, deployed part of the Khalsa and other irregular contingents against Mulraj. On 14 September, the troops from the Khalsa besieging Multan under Sardar Sher Singh Attariwalla also rebelled. They did not join Mulraj however, but moved north along the Chenab River into the main Sikh-populated area of the Punjab to gather recruits and obtain supplies.

Late in 1848, a large British and Bengal army took the field during the cold weather season under the Commander in Chief of the Bengal Army, General Sir Hugh Gough. Gough already had a reputation, whether deserved or not, for unimaginative head-on tactics. On 22 November at Ramnagar, his cavalry were repulsed attacking a Sikh bridgehead on the east bank of the Chenab. Then on 13 January 1849, he launched a hasty frontal attack against Sher Singh's army at Chillianwala near the Jhelum River and was driven back with heavy casualties. Several days' heavy rain followed, preventing either army from renewing the battle. After they had faced each other for three days, both withdrew.

Prelude to the Battle

Rather than launch a counter-attack against Gough, Sher Singh's aim was to join forces with the troops under his father, Sardar Chattar Singh Attariwalla. Chattar Singh's army had been confined to the Hazara region for several months by Muslim irregulars under British officers. At the start of 1849, Amir Dost Mohammed Khan of Afghanistan had sided with the rebellious Sikhs. His aim was to recover the area around Peshawar, which had been conquered by Ranjit Singh early in the nineteenth century, but his support was half-hearted. Nevertheless, when 3,500 Afghan horsemen reconquered Peshawar and approached the vital fort of Attock on the Indus River, its garrison of Muslim troops defected. This allowed Chattar Singh to move out of Hazara and link up with Sher Singh near Rawalpindi.

On the British side, once news of Chillianwala reached Britain, Gough was almost immediately superseded. His replacement was General Charles James Napier, who would require several weeks to travel from England. In the meantime, the Siege of Multan had resumed, and Mulraj was forced to surrender on 22 January. This allowed the bulk of the besieging force to reinforce Gough's army. In particular, they brought large numbers of heavy guns with them. Gough, who had now received word of his dismissal but who remained in command until formally relieved, advanced against the Sikh army. He had three infantry divisions and a large cavalry force, with 100 guns of various weights and calibres.

In spite of his successes, Sher Singh, who commanded the combined Sikh forces, was running out of strategic options. His large army was unable to find enough food. Any move north or west to obtain supplies would involve abandoning the main Sikh-populated area of the Punjab and moving into potentially hostile Muslim areas. He therefore attempted a bold outflanking move against Gough. His army moved east, intending to cross the Chenab and then move south before crossing the river again to attack Gough from the rear. When they reached the river, they found it swollen by heavy rains, and the few fords were defended by irregular Muslim cavalry under British officers, later reinforced by some of the troops marching up from Multan.

Battle

Sher Singh withdrew to Gujrat, where his army hastily prepared a defensive position. The Sikhs constructed a double entrenchment, which was also protected by a ravine. Most of the artillery was grouped in a central battery, screened by hastily planted bushes. The cavalry was deployed on the flanks. Several small villages in advance of the central battery were occupied by infantry, and the houses and buildings were prepared with "loopholes" for defence. Although the position was strong, it was exposed to British artillery fire, and the hastily erected screen of brush was not as effective as the belts of scrub and jungle which had hidden the Sikh artillery from view at Chillianwala.

Early on 21 February, Gough advanced against this position. When the Sikh artillery opened fire and disclosed their position, Gough deployed his large numbers of heavy guns against them. In a three-hour artillery duel, the Sikhs were forced to abandon their guns. Sikh and Indian sources were later to refer to the battle as the "Battle of the Guns". Once the Sikh artillery was largely silenced, the British infantry advanced. There was desperate hand-to-hand fighting for the small fortified villages of Burra Kalra and Chota Kalra. However, the British guns were being advanced in successive "bounds", and the Sikhs broke. Gough reported after the battle:

The heavy artillery continued to advance with extraordinary celerity, taking up successive forward positions, driving the enemy from those [positions] they had retired to, whilst the rapid advance and beautiful fire of the Horse Artillery and light field-batteries ... broke the ranks of the enemy at all points. The whole infantry line now rapidly advanced and drove the enemy before it; the nulla [ravine] was cleared, several villages stormed, the guns that were in position carried, the camp captured and the enemy routed in every direction

Aftermath
The next day, a division under Major General Sir Walter Gilbert took up the pursuit. The remnants of Sher Singh's forces retreated across the Jhelum River and into progressively rougher country with Muslim villagers for eleven days, but Sher Singh was finally forced to agree to British terms for surrender. His army, reduced to 20,000 men (mainly irregular cavalry) and 10 guns, handed over its arms at a two-day ceremony on 12 March and disbanded.

The small Afghan contingent also hastily retreated, destroying the pontoon bridge at Attock behind them. Dost Mohammed later concluded a peace with the East India Company, acknowledging their possession of the Peshawar region.

The Punjab was formally annexed to British territory at Lahore on 2 April.

At the end of his career, Gough had finally fought a model battle, using his vast superiority in heavy guns to drive Sher Singh's troops from their position without resorting to the bayonet as he usually did, and turning their retreat into a rout with his cavalry and horse artillery. He had also been able to operate for the first time without receiving contradictory instructions from Dalhousie. Throughout the war, Dalhousie had alternately goaded on and restrained Gough, usually at the most inconvenient moments.

After the British had withdrawn at Chillianwala, Sikh and other irregulars showed no mercy to abandoned British combatant wounded and the British at Gujrat showed no mercy to surrendered or fleeing enemies.

Order of battle

British regiments
3rd King's Own Light Dragoons
9th Queen's Royal Light Dragoons (Lancers)
14th the King's Light Dragoons
16th Queen's Light Dragoons (Lancers)
10th Foot
24th Foot
29th Foot
32nd Foot
1st Battalion, 60th Rifles
61st Foot

British Indian Army regiments
1st Bengal Light Cavalry
5th Bengal Light Cavalry
6th Bengal Light Cavalry
2nd Bengal (European) Light Infantry
8th Bengal Native Infantry
15th Bengal Native Infantry
20th Bengal Native Infantry
25th Bengal Native Infantry
30th Bengal Native Infantry
31st Bengal Native Infantry
46th Bengal Native Infantry
56th Bengal Native Infantry
69th Bengal Native Infantry
70th Bengal Native Infantry
72nd Bengal Native Infantry
Maratha Light Infantry

References

Sources
 Ian Hernon, "Britain's forgotten wars", Sutton Publishing, 2003, 

 Charles Allen, "Soldier Sahibs", Abacus, 2001,

External links
BritishBattles.com

History of Sikhism
Battles of the Anglo-Sikh wars
Conflicts in 1849
History of Pakistan
1849 in India
February 1849 events
Gujrat